Sherk is a family name that may refer to:

 Bill Sherk, Canadian writer and journalist
 Bonnie Sherk (1945–2021), American artist
 Cathy Sherk (born 1950), former Canadian professional golfer
 Harold Sherk (1903–1974), Canadian Mennonite minister and peace activist
 Jerry Sherk (born 1948), former American football defensive tackle
 Joël Scherk (1946–1980), French theoretical physicist
 Sean Sherk (born 1973), American mixed martial arts fighter
 Stephanie Sherk (-2019), former partner of Mexican actor Demián Bichir